John Darnall may refer to:
 Sir John Darnall (died 1706), English lawyer
 Sir John Darnall (died 1735) (1672–1735), his son, English lawyer